Niall Flannery (born 26 April 1991) is an English hurdler. He competed in the 400 metres hurdles event at the 2015 World Championships in Beijing reaching the semifinals. In addition he finished fourth at the 2014 Commonwealth Games.

His personal best in the 400 metres hurdles is 48.80 seconds set in Ostrava in 2014.

Competition record

References

External links

1991 births
Living people
Sportspeople from Newcastle upon Tyne
English male hurdlers
British male hurdlers
Commonwealth Games competitors for England
Athletes (track and field) at the 2014 Commonwealth Games
World Athletics Championships athletes for Great Britain
British Athletics Championships winners